SGMA may refer to:

  The Southern Gospel Music Association
  The Sustainable Groundwater Management Act, a California law